Rasmus Kaljujärv (born 28 March 1981) is an Estonian actor. Kaljujärv started his movie career in 2003 and has played in 10 films and television series. His father Hannes Kaljujärv is also a well-known Estonian actor.

Selected filmography

Films

Television

References

External links

Living people
1981 births
Estonian male film actors
Estonian male television actors
Estonian male stage actors
Male actors from Tartu
21st-century Estonian male actors
Miina Härma Gymnasium alumni
Estonian Academy of Music and Theatre alumni